The Malahat Review is a Canadian quarterly literary magazine established in 1967. It features contemporary Canadian and international works of poetry, fiction, and creative non-fiction as well as reviews of recently published Canadian literature. Iain Higgins is the current editor.

The Malahat Review publishes new work by emerging and established writers of poetry, fiction, and creative non-fiction from Canada and abroad. The Malahat Review is based in Victoria, British Columbia, and circulates locally, regionally, and nationally throughout Canada and sixteen other countries. A paid subscription base exists that is 88 percent Canadian, with libraries representing 16 percent of paid subscriptions.

History
The Malahat Review was founded in 1967 at the University of Victoria by Robin Skelton and John Peter. The magazine was edited by Skelton from 1971 to 1983, and thereafter by Constance Rooke, Derk Wynand, Marlene Cookshaw, and John Barton (editor from 2004 to 2018). The magazine initially represented Skelton's interest in European and international literature, but has focused on Canadian fiction, poetry, and book reviews since 1983. Creative non-fiction was added as another genre in 2007.

Structure
The Malahat Review is published by the Faculties of Humanities and Fine Arts, at the University of Victoria. It is staffed by the editor, managing editor, a webmaster, and one to two Work Study students. The volunteer editorial committee is divided into three boards: poetry, fiction, and creative nonfiction. The Department of Writing Internship students complete the staff structure.

Awards
The Malahat Review has been nominated for the Western Magazine Award Foundation's Magazine of the Year award eight times, winning it in 1993. Twenty-two Malahat authors have featured in the National Magazine Awards Foundation's roster of finalists, taking home three gold and seven silver awards. Stories by Malahat Review writers have won the M&S Journey Prize six times. Marilyn Harris' début short story Icarus Again, published in the April 1967 issue, and the 2000 Malahat Review Novella Prize winner The Deep, by Mary Swan, won the O. Henry Awards.

Contests
The Malahat Review holds a variety of contests each year:

Open Season Awards: submissions accepted for poetry, fiction, and creative nonfiction - entries are due the first of November each year. Winners are published in the Spring edition.

Novella Prize/Long Poem Prize: The Novella Prize and Long Poem Prize alternate in even and odd years respectively. Regardless of genre, the winning entry or entries appear in the Summer issue.

Far Horizons Awards: These are short form contests. The Fall Horizons Award for Short Fiction is given during odd years, and the Far Horizons Award for poetry is given in even. This contest is only open to writers who have not yet published in book form for the genre in question. Winners are published in the Fall issue.

Constance Rooke Creative Nonfiction Prize: This contest was established in 2007, with the winning entry appearing in the Winter issue. Submissions are due each 1 August.

Location
 The Malahat Review's office is located at the University of Victoria, in the McPherson Library, second floor, Room 202a.

See also 
List of literary magazines

References

External links 
 

1967 establishments in British Columbia
Quarterly magazines published in Canada
Magazines established in 1967
Magazines published in British Columbia
Poetry magazines published in Canada
University of Victoria